The 2nd FINA World Junior Synchronised Swimming Championships was held July 25-28, 1991 in Salerno, Italy. The synchronised swimmers are aged between 15 and 18 years old, swimming in three events: Solo, Duet and Team.

Participating nations
Austria 
Canada 
Egypt 
France 
Great Britain 
Italy 
Japan 
Soviet Union 
Switzerland 
United States

Results

References

FINA World Junior Synchronised Swimming Championships
1991 in synchronized swimming
Swimming
Jun
International aquatics competitions hosted by Italy
Synchronised swimming in Italy